Zhoushan , formerly romanized as Chusan, is an urbanized archipelago with the administrative status of a prefecture-level city in the eastern Chinese province of Zhejiang. It consists of an archipelago of islands at the southern mouth of Hangzhou Bay, off Ningbo. The prefecture's city proper is Dinghai on Zhoushan Island, now administered as the prefecture's Dinghai District. During the 2020 census, Zhoushan Prefecture's population was 1,157,817, out of whom 882,932 lived in the built-up (or metro) area made of two urban districts of Dinghai and Putuo.

On 8 July 2011 the central government approved Zhoushan as Zhoushan Archipelago New Area, a state-level new area.

History

The archipelago was inhabited 6,000 years ago during the Neolithic by people of the Hemudu culture. During the Spring and Autumn period, Zhoushan was called Yongdong, referring to its location east of the Yong River. At the time, it belonged to the state of Yue. The fishermen and sailors who inhabited the islands often engaged in piracy and became recruits for uprisings against the central authorities. At the time of the Eastern Jin, the Zhoushan Islands served as the base for Sun En's rebellion. Sun En, an adherent of the Taoist sect the Way of the Five Pecks of Rice, launched his rebellion around the year 400 and was defeated by Jin forces in 402.

In 863, the Japanese Buddhist monk  and a Putuoshan local Zhang-shi placed a statue of Guanyin at Chaoyin Cave that would later become a popular tourist and pilgrim destination. In 1073, under the Song, it was renamed ; this was upgraded to a prefecture in the early Yuan dynasty. During the Ming dynasty, especially between the years 1530 and 1560, Japanese and Chinese pirates used Zhoushan as one of their principal bases from which they launched attacks as far as Nanjing; "the whole Chinese coast from northern Shandong to western Guangdong was ravaged to a distance of sixty miles inland."

After suppression of the pirates, Zhoushan became an important commercial port of entry. Under the early Qing dynasty, it played a similar role to Xiamen and Guangzhou as a frequent port of call for Western traders. Changguo Prefecture became  within Zhejiang Province in 1688 under the Qing. The restriction of all European trade to the port of Guangzhou in 1760 forced Westerners to leave Zhoushan. One of the requests of Lord Macartney's embassy to the Qianlong Emperor in 1793 was an acquisition of "a small unfortified island near Zhoushan for the residence of English traders, storage of goods, and outfitting of ships." The Qianlong Emperor denied this request together with all the rest.

British forces under Captain Charles Elliot captured Zhoushan on 5–6 July 1840 during the First Opium War and evacuated it in early 1841, after Elliot reached an agreement with Qishan, the Governor-General of Tianjin and Grand Secretary to the Daoguang Emperor, in exchange for Hong Kong. At that time, Zhoushan was a well known port while Hong Kong was still only a fishing village. The British Foreign Secretary Palmerston was furious when he learned that Elliot agreed to the cede Zhoushan for Hong Kong, described as "a barren island with hardly a house on it" Elliot was dismissed in April 1841 for his blunder. His replacement Sir Henry Pottinger led a British fleet that recaptured Zhoushan on 1 October 1841. The First Opium War ended with conclusion of the Treaty of Nanjing in which China opened up the cities of Guangzhou ("Canton"), Fuzhou ("Foochow"), Xiamen ("Amoy"), Ningbo ("Ningpo"), and Shanghai to residence by British subjects for the purpose of trade. As a result, Britain no longer had any use for Zhoushan but it kept the island until 1846 as a guarantee for the fulfilment of the stipulations of the treaty. Dinghai was upgraded to a directly controlled subprefecture sometime in 1841.

Zhoushan was also occupied by the British in 1860 during the Second Opium War. Wang Yijun, a leader of the Taiping rebels, attempted to retake Zhoushan from its Qing garrison on 13 February 1862 but was defeated and killed.

Following the Xinhai Revolution and the establishment of the Republic of China, Dinghai Subprefecture reverted to a county. Sun Yat-sen visited Zhoushan on 25 August 1916 and wrote Travelling to Putuo (You Putuo Zhiqi). On 1 October 1942, the Japanese ship Lisbon Maru was transporting 1,800 POWs to Tokyo when she was attacked by the USSGrouper off Qingbing or Dongfu; one torpedo hit and she sank the next day. The fishermen of nearby Dongji rescued 384 of the British prisoners from the wreckage. Amid the Chinese Civil War, Dinghai County lost Shengsi, which became an Archipelago Directly controlled District of Jiangsu in 1946, then a separate county in October 1949. The same year, Dinghai County was divided into Dinghai and Wengzhou Counties. In November, the Communists landed on Dengbu Island, but were repulsed by the defenders.

Nevertheless, Zhoushan was overrun by the Communists on 17 May 1950. Wengzhou was merged back into Dinghai County, which made up part of Ningbo Prefecture, and Shengsi made up a special area and then county of the Songjiang Prefecture, then still part of Jiangsu. In March 1953, the Council of Ministers opted to establish the Zhoushan Prefecture, returning Shengsi and dividing Dinghai into Dinghai, Putuo, and Daishan. Ningbo's Xiangshan County was also briefly incorporated into this new prefecture from 1954 to 1958. From 1958 to May 1962, Zhoushan was incorporated into Ningbo before becoming a separate prefecture again. Shengsi was temporarily assigned to Shanghai in the early 1960s. The short-lived Daqu County was created in 1962 before being redivided between Daishan and Shengsi four years later.

Zhoushan was promoted to a prefecture-level "city" on 27 January 1987, with Dinghai and Putuo Counties upgraded to districts. The municipal People's Government was established on 8 March of that year. April of the same year, the ports of Zhoushan became open to foreign ships. On 10 April 1988, it became a coastal economic open zone.

Administrative divisions
Zhoushan administers two districts and two counties. The city currently consists of 36 township-level divisions, including 17 towns, 5 townships and 14 subdistricts. Detailed divisions are listed as follows.

Dinghai District (13 divisions, including 10 sub-districts and 3 towns)
Sub-district: Jiefang (解放), Changguo (昌国), Huannan (環南), Chengdong (城東), Yancang (盐倉), Lincheng (临城), Qiandao (千島), Xiaosha (小沙), Ma'ao (馬岙), Cengang (岑港)
Town: Baiquan (白泉), Jintang (金塘), Ganlan (干𬒗)
Putuo District (9 divisions, including 4 sub-districts and 5 towns)
Sub-district: Shenjiamen (沈家门), Donggang (东港), Zhanmao (展茅), Zhujiajian (朱家尖)
Town: Putuoshan (普陀山), Dongji (东极), Taohua (桃花), Xiazhi (蝦峙), Liuheng (六橫)
Daishan County (7 divisions, including 6 towns and 1 township)
Town: Gaoting (高亭), Qushan (衢山), Changtu (長涂), Dongsha (東沙), Daidong (岱東), Daixi (岱西)
Township: Xiushan (秀山)
Shengsi County (7 divisions, including 3 towns and 4 townships)
Town: Caiyuan (菜園), Yangshan (洋山), Shengshan (嵊山) 
Township: Wulong (五龍), Huanglong (黃龍), Gouqi (枸杞), Huaniao (花鳥)

In particular, Qiandao and Lincheng sub-districts of Dinghai District are governed by a special new town administration committee of Zhoushan.

Geography

The Zhoushan Archipelago, comprising 1,390 islands and 3,306 reefs, is outside of Hangzhou Bay. It is the largest archipelago of China. Below is a list of major inhabited islands.

(DH = Dinghai District, PT = Putuo District, DS = Daishan County, SS = Shengsi County)

There are six major islands (over ):
 Zhoushan Island, 635,595 (DH/PT)
 Daishan Island, 111,765 (DS)
 Liuheng Island, 59,102 (PT)
 Jintang Island, 37,321 (DH)
 Zhujiajian Island, 27,981 (PT)
 Qushan Island, 53,016 (DS)

There are 11 middle-size islands (between ):
 Taohua Island, 10,867 (PT)
 Greater Changtu Island, 1,750 (DS)
 Xiushan Island, 10,106 (DS)
 Sijiao Island, 39,008 (SS)
 Xiazhi Island, 11,247 (PT)
 Dengbu Island, 2,479 (PT)
 Mount Putuo, 10,337 (PT)
 Cezi Island, 6,334 (DH)
 Changbai Island, 3,066 (DH)
 Lesser Changtu Island, 19,750 (DS)
 Dayu Island, 788 (DS)

Zhoushan includes  of marine territory, but only  of land,  of which are submerged during high tides.

Zhoushan has a four-season, monsoon-influenced humid subtropical climate (Köppen Cfa), with cool, damp winters, and hot, humid summers. Precipitation is significant throughout the year, with the greatest rainfall during summer. With 1,938 hours of bright sunshine annually, ranging from 34% sunshine in March to 56% in July, the second half of the year is sunnier.

Demographics

According to the report from the Sixth National Population Census of the People's Republic of China, the total population of Zhoushan Municipality is 1,121,261 with 588,414 males and 532,847 females as of 1 November 2010, among which an overwhelmingly majority is Han Chinese (1,109,813). The number of households is about 454,800. For an administrative division distribution, Dinghai District has a population of 464,184, Putuo District has a population of 378,805, Daishan County has a population of 202,164 and Shengsi County has a population of 76,108. In terms of education attainment, about 10 percent of the total population (115,286) has received higher education, while a population of 77,577 is illiterate or semiliterate. In terms of age distribution, there is a child (aged 0–14) population of 114,265 and a senior population of 176,331.

Economy

Traditionally Zhoushan had relied heavily on the primary sector, especially fishing, given Zhoushan is the largest fishery in China. Nowadays with the development of the secondary and tertiary sectors, Zhoushan's economic base has been largely diversified. Ship building and repairing, shipping, light industry, tourism and service industry grow to be the major contributors of local economic output. In 2016, the entire municipality achieved a total Gross Domestic Product (GDP) of 122.85 billion yuan (approximately 16,013 US dollars per capita), with an increase of 11.3% from the previous year. The city continuously ranked 3rd among 11 municipalities of Zhejiang Province. However, since Zhoushan has a significantly smaller population compared with other municipalities, the absolute figure of total GDP still ranked the last place in the province. The structure of three sectors of industry is 10.6 : 39.8 : 49.6.  In 2012, Zhoushan Port alone processed 290,990 kilotons of cargo. If combined with Ningbo Port (Ningbo and Zhoushan Ports are essentially one port with shared infrastructure, harbor basin and administrative collaboration), the entire greater port handled approximately 744,000 kilotons of cargo, surpassing Shanghai Port to be world's new busiest port in terms of cargo tonnage.

In 2012, Zhoushan's per capita disposable income of urban residents reached 34,224 yuan, with a 12.2% increase from the previous year (an increase of 10.3% considering the price and inflation factors). On the other hand, Zhoushan's per capital net income of rural residents reached 18,601 yuan, with a 12.9% increase from the previous year (an increase of 11.0% considering the price and inflation factors). The Engel's Coefficients for urban and rural residents are 35.9% and 38.1% respectively. The average housing building areas are 32.39 and 49.10 square meters for urban and rural residents respectively.

Transportation 

Zhoushan is served by different modes of transportation, including air, highway and water. The transportation condition in Zhoushan has been improved largely during recent years, especially after the opening of Zhoushan Trans-Oceanic Bridges in 2009, which established a stable corridor connecting to the continent and converted Zhoushan into a peninsula per se. Due to geographical isolation, Zhoushan is the only one of the municipalities in Zhejiang Province which is not served with rail transportation.

Air transportation

 Albeit named after Mt. Putuo, Zhoushan Putuoshan Airport is located on Zhujiajian Island, and is a domestic hub with scheduled passenger flights to several cities in China, including Shanghai, Beijing, Guangzhou, Shenzhen, Xiamen, Fuzhou, Hefei, Lianyungang, Jieyang and Jinjiang. The construction of the airport began in March 1997 and completed in August 1997 with an investment of 410 million RMB yuan, and is rated as a 4D airport. As of 2016, Zhoushan Airport is the 86th largest civic airport in Mainland China in terms of passengers handled with a total of 800.9 thousand users. Expansion including a new terminal and  taxiway is under construction.

Road transportation

 Zhoushan Trans-Oceanic Bridges, the indispensable component of Yongzhou Expressway (numbered G9211 in the National Trunk Highway System), consist of five consecutive bridges which connect Zhoushan to the mainland, Zhenhai District of Ningbo to be specific. These five bridges are Cengang Bridge, Xiangjiaomen Bridge, Taoyaomen Bridge, Xihoumen Bridge and Jintang Bridge. The painstaking huge project, started in 1999 and completed in 2010, is the largest bridge group in China. Xihoumen Bridge, in particular, is the world's second-longest suspension bridge in terms of the length of the central span.

It is also the shortest national level highway that runs in the east–west direction. Before reaching Zhoushan, Highway 329 passes through municipalities of Shaoxing and Ningbo. The route between the boundaries of Ningbo and Zhoushan is built in the form of ferry, which is also unique in the national highway system. The ferry dock on Ningbo's side is named Baifeng, and the one on Zhoushan's side is named Yadanshan. The route of Highway 329 in Zhoushan has undergone several changes and adjustments. Initially the route went through the southern shoreline of Zhoushan Island and ended in Shenjiamen. However, with the construction of Zhujiajian Bridge, the route was extended all the way to Nansha Beach of Zhujiajian Island. Later, with the development Dinghai and Lincheng, part of Highway 329 was designated as urban roads instead of a rapid passing corridor. Therefore, Highway 329 went on to take the route of the outer ring road of Dinghai and Highway Baiquan-Shenjiamen. Recently to optimize the highway structure of Zhoushan, Highway 329 is undergoing another large modification in its route. The new route, designed with a series of tunnels and interchanges, will run at the center of Zhoushan Island to form its backbone. A total of 5 interchanges are designed along the new route. The project, projected to spend 5 billion yuan, is set to finish in 2015.
 Zhoushan bus rapid transit is the rapid transit system with dedicated lanes between urban agglomerations on Zhoushan Island. A total of 10 BRT stops are set on Line One: Dinghai Dongmen, Dinghai Tanfeng, Dinghai Chengdong, Xincheng Nanhai, Xincheng Central, Xincheng Zhoushan Hospital, Xincheng Fulidao Road, Putuo Puxi, Putuo Chengbei, and Putuo Donggang Gymnasium. The service time for Line One starts at 6:30 and ends at 20:00 with a frequency of approximately 120 daily. The standard fare is 2 yuan regardless of stops traveled. Passengers with public transit IC cards are eligible for a 20 percentage discount per trip. Passengers can transfer to normal public transit buses once for free within one hour of initial aboard time. All buses are covered with 4G wireless signal. Other lines are being planned and will be constructed in the near future.

Rail transportation

The line is planned to include 9 stations. The section between Ningbo East Station and Jintang Station runs passenger and freight trains, while the section between Jintang Station and Baiquan Station is a dedicated line for passengers.

Water transportation

 Two major ferry routes with high frequency (intervals vary from fifteen minutes to an hour) connect Zhoushan Main Island to Shanghai to the north and Ningbo to the south. Besides, there are scheduled ships travelling between Zhoushan and other ports, such as Wenzhou and Fuzhou. Major inhabited islands within the municipality are served by smaller scale ferries and speedboat fleets. Frequencies depend on levels of population.

Energy 
There exist 2 power connections: HVDC Zhoushan, the first HVDC built in China and Zhoushan Island Overhead Powerline Tie with the tallest electricity pylons in the world, as well as the world's longest span.

Tourism

Zhoushan, which proudly boasts two national level key scenic areas (Mount Putuo and Shengsi Islands) and two provincial level key scenic areas (Taohua Island and Daishan), is always praised to be the "backyard garden" of Yangtze River Delta. Beside these scenic areas, Zhoushan has an abundance of points of interest, landscape forms and tourism resources, many of which are still under development, due to its rich historic and natural endowment. Conveniently connected to the continental part of the delta, Zhoushan attracted 27.71 million visitors (which is approximately 25 times its population), 310.5 thousand of whom were from abroad, in 2012 alone. Tourism and its related services have risen to be a very important sector of the municipal economy with a total tourism revenue of 26.68 billion yuan, according to the 2012 statistic.

Mount Putuo National Scenic Area

Mount Putuo National Scenic Area consists of two parts, Mount Putuo and Zhujiajian Eastern Coast, although most people would easily ignore the latter part due to its overwhelming fame of Mount Putuo.

On a visit in the early 1830s, missionary Karl Gützlaff noted that the island of "Poo-to" boasted two large and 60 small temples, attended by 2,000 monks,

To every person who visits this island, it appears at first like a fairy land, so romantic is everything which meets the eye.  Those large inscriptions hewn in solid granite, the many temples which appear in every direction, the highly picturesque scenery itself, with its many-peaked, riven, and detached rocks, and above all a stately mausoleum, the largest which I have ever seen, containing the bones and ashes of thousands of priests, quite bewilder the imagination.

Mount Putuo, also named Mount Meicen and Mount Baihua, is considered the bodhimanda of Avalokitesvara (Guanyin), a revered Bodhisattva in many parts of East Asia. It is one of the four sacred mountains in Chinese Buddhism, the others being Mount Wutai, Mount Jiuhua, and Mount Emei. Mount Putuo features three grand temples (Puji Temple, Fayu Temple, and Huiji Temple), three treasures (Tahoto Pagoda, Yangzhi Guanyin Stele, and Nine-Dragon Caisson), three rocks (Rock Pantuo, Heart Rock, and Rock Ergui Tingfa), three caves (Cave Chaoyang, Cave Chaoyin and Cave Fanyin), 88 nunneries and 128 huts, and twelve scenes. Mount Putuo was praised in various historic records. It is often titled as Bulguksa Among Seas and Skies, or Sacred Ground on the Southern Seas. Mount Putuo is always mentioned in the same breath with the West Lake in Hangzhou, another national scenic area of Zhejiang. West Lake is considered to be the foremost place that combines mountain and lake views, whereas Mount Putuo is deemed as the top place where integrates mountain and sea views.

Zhujiajian is the fifth largest island of the archipelago and a newly developed seaside resort with intriguing seascapes, unmarred beaches, dense woods, sheer rock cliffs, hills for hiking, extraordinary seafood and displays of fishermen folk culture. It is home to the Zhoushan International Sand Sculpture Festival, which is held on the Nansha Beach, one of the five consecutive beaches, at the turn of summer and autumn every year. Daqing Mountain is the best location to get the incomparable view of southern Zhoushan Islands and the continental China (Chuanshan Peninsula) on clear days. It is also an ideal place for extreme sports, such as car racing, mountain cycling, gliding, rock climbing and bungee jumping. Baishan Mountain features huge natural rocks of different shapes, Guanyin carving on the cliff, and the Putuo Impression show, directed by Zhang Yimou. Zhujiajian is also the site for Mount Putuo Buddhist Academy. Wushitang (Dark Stone Beach) is the  beach consisting of numerous dark colored pebbles.

Shengsi Islands National Scenic Area

Shengsi Islands National Scenic Area is the only national level scenic area in China that is established on a group of natural islands. The scenic area, consisting of hundreds of islands outlying the Hangzhou Bay, boasts multiple quality beaches, rocks, and cliffs. Although it is commonly endowed with natural seascape beauty, each island is unique. Jihu and Nanchangtu Twin Beaches, the northernmost sand beaches of Southern China (and the natural beaches closest to Shanghai), make Sijiao Island a popular tourism destination. Shengshan is one of the most important fishing ports on the East China Sea. The eastern coast of Shengshan Island features steep cliffs, an ideal place to view sunrise above the sea. On the north coast is the abandoned fishing village of Houtouwan, now overgrown with vegetation. Gouqi Island has well-preserved fishing villages and cultures, the largest aquatic farm in China and the Mountain and Sea Wonders rock that was believed to be left by General Hou Jigao of Ming Dynasty, who defended the southeastern coast against the raids from wokou. Huaniao Island features the Huaniao Lighthouse, initially built in 1870 with the reputation of the first lighthouse of the Far East, that stands on the busiest shipping route in China entering and leaving Shanghai and the Yangtze River. The lighthouse has been on the National Major Historical and Cultural Sites list under protection since 2001.

Taohua Island Provincial Level Scenic Area

Taohua Island is the most botanically diversified island in Zhejiang's coastal area, with nearly 600 species of trees and plants, including oranges, orchids and narcissus – and now peach trees. It is also a popular site for shooting movies and TV series based on Mr. Jin Yong's novels. Four Chinese TV serials – "The Eagle-Shooting Heroes," "Demi-Gods and Semi-Devils," "The Return of the Condor Heroes" and "Duke of Mount Deer" – were filmed on the island. Starting from 2004, the Jin Yong Martial Arts (Wuxia) Culture Festival is held here every other year around summer. It offers dazzling martial arts performances and competitions, all thrilling for Cha's fans.

Daishan Provincial Level Scenic Area

Daishan (岱山), originally known as Penglai, is believed to have been reached by Xu Fu of Qin Dynasty during his eastward journey to Japan. Ciyun Temple is the major temple on Mount Moxin and a popular scenic spot. It is an ideal place for camping, flying kites, and movie-shooting. The beach is also the location for yearly worship services or matsuris of the ocean for fishing harvest. Dongsha Ancient Town was once the county seat of Daishan, with hundreds years of commercial and exchange activities associated to traditional fishing industry. Several major buildings and facilities have been well protected. Shuanghe features wonderful large-scale man-made cliffs and precipices which are the result of hundreds years of carving for granite materials for architectural purposes. Daishan has the reputation of being a county of museums. Its collection of museums include themes such as fishing culture, Zhoushan dialect, typhoon, lighthouse, salt production, etc. Besides the above-stated attractions on Daishan Island, other islands are noteworthy as well. For example, Xiushan Island features the only inter-tidal mud theme park in China. Qushan Island features Mount Guanyin, which is also a bodhimanda of Guanyin. Changtu is a traditional fishing port.

Other attractions

Dongji Islands, formerly known as Zhongjieshan Chain of Islands (中街山列岛), is a group of islands located at the eastmost end of the Zhoushan Archipelago, extending far into the East China Sea. It is famous for well-preserved original fishing villages, and unpolluted natural seascapes.
Shenjiamen Fishing Port is the traditional center of Zhoushan Fishery and the largest fishing port of China. Its seafront promenade of open-air seafood restaurants is widely appreciated for fresh seafood served, wonderful views of the port and plenty of strolling musicians.
Opium War Memorial (Zhushan Park) is an urban park at the southwestern corner of Dinghai county town in memory of the battle fought between Zhoushaners and the British around 1840, notably the heroic deeds of three generals, Ge Yunfei, Wang Xipeng and Zheng Guohong.

Notable people

Arts

He Wei (1922–2011), writer
Sanmao (1943–1991), Taiwanese writer
Wong Kar-wai (born 1958), Hong Kong filmmaker
Michael Miu (born 1958), Hong Kong TVB actor
Wu Shanzhuan (born 1960), artist
He Saifei (born 1964), actress
Sandy Lam (born 1966), Hong Kong singer

Politics

K. H. Ting (1915–2012), vice-chairman of the 10th CPPCC National Committee, chairman of the China Amity Foundation
Qiao Shi (1924–2015), former chairman of People's Congress of the People's Republic of China
Tung Chee Hwa (born 1937), the first elected Chief Executive of the Hong Kong Special Administrative Region
Chai Songyue (born 1941), former governor of Zhejiang Province (1997–2002)
Carrie Lam Cheng Yuet-ngor (born 1957), the fifth elected Chief Executive of the Hong Kong Special Administrative Region

Entrepreneurs

Tung Chao Yung (1912–1982), shipping tycoon and founder of several major shipping companies
Yang Yuanqing (born 1964), chief executive officer of Lenovo
 Jin Zhuanglong (born 1964), chairman of Commercial Aircraft Corporation of China Ltd

Others

 Xu Jingbo (born 1963), journalist and founder of Asian News Agency
 Ji Xiaohua (born 1977), founder of popular science website guokr.com

Education

Zhoushan City has 111 licensed kindergartens, 62 primary schools, 34 middle schools, 16 high schools, 7 vocational schools, and 3 higher-educational level colleges and universities. Zhoushan High School, Dinghai First High School, Putuo High School, Daishan High School, and Shengsi High School are province level key public high schools. Putuo No.2 Middle School is one of the noted secondary schools in the Putuo District. Nanhai Experimental School, located at Lincheng Sub-District of Dinghai and established in 2001, is a major private school. Zhejiang Ocean University and Zhejiang University (Zhoushan Campus) are two well-known universities in the city.

Twin towns – sister cities

  City of Greater Geraldton, Western Australia, Australia
  Cangzhou, Hebei
  Richmond, California, United States
  La Spezia, Province of La Spezia, Italy
  Szekszárd, Tolna County, Hungary
  Tinos, Cyclades, Greece
  Lefkada, Ionian Islands, Greece
  Kesennuma, Miyagi, Japan
  Ganghwa County, Incheon Metropolitan City, South Korea
  Gokseong County, South Jeolla Province, South Korea
  Sacheon City, South Gyeongsang Province, South Korea
  Imus, Cavite, Philippines
  Zamboanga City, Philippines

See also 
 List of islands of China
 East Sea Fleet

Notes

References

Citations

Bibliography

Further reading
 (the New York Public Library)(Digitized 2 December 2009)

External links 

 Government website of Zhoushan 
 New Area website of Zhoushan 
 Government website of Zhoushan 
 舟山网 (Zhoushan Net) : Local news and info
 "Undiscovered Zhoushan" : Maps and tourist information

 
Archipelagoes of the Pacific Ocean
Cities in Zhejiang
Prefecture-level divisions of Zhejiang
Archipelagoes of China
Islands of the East China Sea